Stordal Church is a parish church of the Church of Norway in Fjord Municipality in Møre og Romsdal county, Norway. It is located in the village of Stordal. It is the church for the Stordal parish which is part of the Nordre Sunnmøre prosti (deanery) in the Diocese of Møre. The white, wooden church was built in a long church style in 1907 using plans drawn up by the architect Jens Zetlitz Monrad Kielland. The church seats about 270 people. The church has a large steeple in the front.

History
The new church was built in 1907. It has a large tower on the west end of the nave. On the east end of the nave lies the choir which has a semi-circular apse on the east end. The choir is flanked by sacristies with slightly unusual shapes.

Media gallery

See also
List of churches in Møre

References

Fjord (municipality)
Churches in Møre og Romsdal
Long churches in Norway
Wooden churches in Norway
20th-century Church of Norway church buildings
Churches completed in 1907
1907 establishments in Norway